WKDW is a classic country formatted broadcast radio station licensed to Staunton, Virginia, serving Staunton and Augusta County, Virginia.  WKDW is owned and operated by iHeartMedia, Inc.

References

External links
 900 WKDW Online

1954 establishments in Virginia
Classic country radio stations in the United States
Radio stations established in 1954
KDW
IHeartMedia radio stations
Augusta County, Virginia